The orange-banded flycatcher (Nephelomyias lintoni) is a species of bird in the family Tyrannidae. It is found in southern Ecuador and far northern Peru. Its natural habitat is subtropical or tropical moist montane forests. It is threatened by habitat loss.

References

orange-banded flycatcher
Birds of the Ecuadorian Andes
orange-banded flycatcher
orange-banded flycatcher
Taxonomy articles created by Polbot